Bix 7 Road Race and Memorial Jazz Festival refers to a pair of related, but separate, events held on consecutive weekends:

 Bix 7 Road Race
 Bix Beiderbecke Memorial Jazz Festival